The Palmetto Championship at Congaree was a PGA Tour stroke play event that was played for the first time from June 10–13, 2021 at Congaree Golf Club in Gillisonville near Ridgeland, South Carolina. The event was announced April 2, 2021 and was a one-time event, as a replacement to the 2021 RBC Canadian Open which was canceled due to logistical challenges related to the ongoing COVID-19 pandemic.

Garrick Higgo won the event by one stroke in just his second PGA Tour start.

Winners

References

External links
Coverage on the PGA Tour's official site

Former PGA Tour events
Golf in South Carolina
Sports competitions in South Carolina